Michael or Micky Fenton may refer to:

Michael Fenton (politician) (1789–1874), colonial Tasmania politician, first Speaker of the Tasmanian House of Assembly
Micky Fenton (1913–2003), England international footballer for Middlesbrough
Michael Fenton, see Green Party of Ontario candidates, 1995 Ontario provincial election
Micky Fenton (jockey) (born 1972), jockey